"Start wit Me" is a song by American rapper Roddy Ricch, featuring vocals from fellow American rapper Gunna. The song was released as the second single from Ricch's debut studio album, Please Excuse Me for Being Antisocial, on October 25, 2019. The song was written by the artists and the producers JetsonMade and Jasper Harris.

Composition and lyrics
The song's beat has been compared to that of DaBaby's sound. Lyrically, Ricch "tweaks cliches just enough to stay unpredictable", rapping about his extravagant lifestyle and his "brand new draco", with him and Gunna throwing warning shots to any opposers threatening to step to them.

Critical reception
Upon its release, Pitchfork named it the "New Rap Song of the Day", with the magazine's Sheldon Pearce praising producer JetsonMade's flute line and "caroming drums that elevate the song".

Music video
A music video to accompany the release of "Start wit Me" was first released onto YouTube on October 28, 2019. It was directed by Spike Jordan and shot in California, giving off "street vibes with various foreign cars, guns, and girls". According to Heran Mamo of 
Billboard, the video "depicts the real-life peril a neighborhood like Ricch's Compton hometown regularly goes through when a group plots and carries out; a drive-by shooting on another [group], juxtaposing the resulting bloodshed with the local kids' sidewalk chalk drawings". Conversely, Mamo further noted, Ricch "feels richer than ever in the cinematic clip, as he sits atop a Rolls-Royce (coincidentally with the star's same initials) and brags about his new guns and designer jewels alike".

Live performances
On December 16, 2019, Roddy Ricch performed the song live, alongside an 8-piece orchestra, at Peppermint Club in Los Angeles for Audiomack's Trap Symphony series.

Personnel
Credits adapted from Tidal.
 Roddy Ricch – vocals, songwriting
 Gunna – vocals, songwriting
 JetsonMade – production, songwriting
 Jasper Harris – production, songwriting
 Derek "MixedByAli" Ali – mixing
 Mike Bozzi – mastering

Charts

Weekly charts

Year-end charts

Certifications

References

2019 singles
2019 songs
Atlantic Records singles
Roddy Ricch songs
Gunna (rapper) songs
Songs written by Gunna (rapper)
Songs written by Roddy Ricch